
Gmina Opinogóra Górna is a rural gmina (administrative district) in Ciechanów County, Masovian Voivodeship, in east-central Poland.

Villages
Gmina Opinogóra Górna contains the villages and settlements of Bacze, Bogucin, Chrzanówek, Chrzanowo, Czernice, Długołęka, Dzbonie, Elżbiecin, Goździe, Janowięta, Kąty, Klonowo, Kobylin, Kołaczków, Kołaki-Budzyno, Kołaki-Kwasy, Kotermań, Łaguny, Łęki, Opinogóra Dolna, Opinogóra Górna, Opinogóra-Kolonia, Pajewo-Króle, Pałuki, Pokojewo, Pomorze, Przedwojewo, Przytoka, Rąbież, Rembówko, Rembowo, Sosnowo, Wierzbowo, Wilkowo, Władysławowo, Wola Wierzbowska, Wólka Łanięcka, Załuże-Imbrzyki, Załuże-Patory and Zygmuntowo.

Neighbouring gminas
Gmina Opinogóra Górna is bordered by the town of Ciechanów and by the gminas of Ciechanów, Czernice Borowe, Gołymin-Ośrodek, Krasne and Regimin.

References

Polish official population figures 2006

Opinogora Gorna
Ciechanów County